Tim Cahill is an American producer, writer, director, and animator who co-created the Cartoon Network series My Gym Partner's a Monkey with his wife Julie McNally Cahill. He, along with his wife, have co-developed and are story editors for the 2012 Littlest Pet Shop series, and is a writer for The High Fructose Adventures of Annoying Orange. He and his wife also worked for Warner Bros. on Histeria, Detention, Animaniacs, The Sylvester & Tweety Mysteries, Baby Looney Tunes, Mucha Lucha, and Krypto the Superdog.

Screenwriting

Television
 series head writer denoted in bold
 The Sylvester & Tweety Mysteries (1997-1998)
 Histeria! (1998-2000)
 Detention (1999-2000)
 Baby Looney Tunes (2002)
 Tutenstein (2004)
 ¡Mucha Lucha! (2004-2005)
 Krypto the Superdog (2005)
 My Gym Partner’s a Monkey (2005-2006)
 Sherm! (2006)
 The High Fructose Adventures of Annoying Orange (2012-2013)
 Littlest Pet Shop (2012-2016)
 Transformers: Robots in Disguise (2017)
 The Tom and Jerry Show (2018-2019)
 The Gumazing Gum Girl! (TBA)

Films
 Carrotblanca (1995)
 Tweety’s High-Flying Adventure (2000)
 Tom and Jerry: The Magic Ring (2001)
 Baby Looney Tunes' Eggs-traordinary Adventure (2003)

Director
 series director denoted in bold
 My Gym Partner's a Monkey (2005-2008)

References

External links

Living people
American male writers
American animators
American animated film producers
American television producers
Cartoon Network Studios people
Year of birth missing (living people)